= Paul Berenger (actor) =

Zimbabwean-born Australian actor

- Born: Paul Marcel Berenger; March 26, 1991 (age 35); Harare, Zimbabwe
- Occupation: Actor
- Years active: 2008–present
- Height: 6 ft 0 in (183 cm)

Paul Marcel Berenger (born 26 March 1991), is a Zimbabwe-born Australian actor.

== Personal life ==
Berenger was born on 26 March 1991 in Harare, Zimbabwe. However, he was forced to relocate to Australia under adverse geographical circumstances.

== Career ==
At the age of 11, he had a passion for acting after seeing his older brother on stage in a primary school play. However, he started acting after moving to Australia. Berenger made his first cinema appearance with 2008 film Two Fists, One Heart. Later he has acted in several short films such as Brittany, Die Krankenhaus, The Army Within and Impasse.

== Filmography ==
Year	Film	Role	Genre	Ref.
2008	Two Fists, One Heart	Gav	Film	
2010	Cain Rose Up	Harry	Short film	
2011	Brittany	Paul	Short film	
2013	Jack and James	Jack	Short film	
2013	Die Krankenhaus	Major James Evans	Short film	
2014	It's a Dole Life	Nurse Mark / Redfoo	TV series	
2014	Dark Temptations	Louis Vestal	TV series	
2014	Deadly Women	Gregory Locke / Ben Sakisi	TV series documentary	
2014	The Army Within	Scott	Short film	
2014	Impasse	Lucas	Short film	
2015	Bagged: The Vanden Cox Story	Vanden Cox	Short film	
2015	All About E	George	Film	
